The 2011–12 Sussex County Football League season was the 87th in the history of Sussex County Football League a football competition in England.

Division One

Division One featured 16 clubs which competed in the division last season, along with four new clubs.
Clubs promoted from Division Two:
A.F.C. Uckfield
Lancing
Worthing United
Plus:
Horsham YMCA, relegated from the Isthmian League

League table

Division Two

Division Two featured 14 clubs which competed in the division last season, along with four new clubs:
Dorking Wanderers, promoted from Division Three
Eastbourne United Association, relegated from Division One
Hailsham Town, demoted from Division One
Wick, demoted from Division One

League table

Division Three

Division Three featured 14 clubs which competed in the division last season, along with two new clubs:
Clymping, relegated from Division Two
Roffey, joined from the Mid-Sussex League

League table

References

2011-12
9